Nedo Turković (born 23 October 1989) is a Bosnian professional footballer who plays as a forward.

Club career
In his career, Turković played for FK Željezničar Sarajevo, NK Napredak, NK Travnik, FK Lovćen, FC Akzhayik in Kazakhstan, Shuvalan FK in Azerbaijan, FK Olimpik Sarajevo, NK Brežice 1919 in Slovenia, NEROCA F.C. in India and Qormi F.C. in Malta. F.C.Turris Turnu Magurele and ASC FC Arges Pitesti in Romania. Saudi Arabia team F.C.Al-Taqadum..

Current team is F.C. Al- Diwaniyah Iraq.

NEROCA
Signing for NEROCA of the Indian I-League in December 2017, and making his debut in a 1-0 win over Lajong, Turković claimed he earned a higher salary there than when he played in Europe, adding that the prices in India were not extortionate as well with the club providing everything he needed. He left Neroca in October 2018.

Qormi
On 26 October 2018, Turković signed with Maltese Premier League club Qormi F.C. On 3 January 2019, Turković left Qormi after playing only 3 league games for the club.

Turris Turnu Mgurele
On 18 July 2019, Turković signed a contract with Romanian Liga II side Turris-Oltul Turnu Măgurele.

Swadhinata KS
On 19 November 2021, Turković joined Bangladesh Premier League club Swadhinata KS

Abahani Limited Dhaka 
On 7 April 2022, fellow Bengali side Abahani Limited Dhaka signed Turkovic in preparation for the 2022 AFC Cup.

References

External links 
 Soccerway Profile

1989 births
Living people
Footballers from Sarajevo
Association football forwards
Bosnia and Herzegovina footballers
FK Željezničar Sarajevo players
NK SAŠK Napredak players
NK Travnik players
FK Lovćen players
FC Akzhayik players
AZAL PFK players
FK Olimpik players
NK Brežice 1919 players
NEROCA FC players
Qormi F.C. players
AFC Turris-Oltul Turnu Măgurele players
FC Argeș Pitești players
Al-Taqadom FC players
Al-Diwaniya FC players
Premier League of Bosnia and Herzegovina players
Montenegrin First League players
Kazakhstan Premier League players
Azerbaijan Premier League players
Slovenian Second League players
I-League players
Maltese Premier League players
Liga II players
Saudi Second Division players
Iraqi Premier League players
Bosnia and Herzegovina expatriate footballers
Bosnia and Herzegovina expatriate sportspeople in Montenegro
Expatriate footballers in Montenegro
Bosnia and Herzegovina expatriate sportspeople in Kazakhstan
Expatriate footballers in Kazakhstan
Bosnia and Herzegovina expatriate sportspeople in Azerbaijan
Expatriate footballers in Azerbaijan
Bosnia and Herzegovina expatriate sportspeople in Slovenia
Expatriate footballers in Slovenia
Bosnia and Herzegovina expatriate sportspeople in India
Expatriate footballers in India
Bosnia and Herzegovina expatriate sportspeople in Malta
Expatriate footballers in Malta
Bosnia and Herzegovina expatriate sportspeople in Romania
Expatriate footballers in Romania
Bosnia and Herzegovina expatriate sportspeople in Saudi Arabia
Expatriate footballers in Saudi Arabia
Expatriate footballers in Iraq